Bengo may refer to

 Bengo (province), Angola
 Bengo (municipality) (Ícolo e Bengo), Angola
 Bengo the Boxer puppy, a 1950s cartoon by William Timym